Bookout is a surname, and may refer to:

Billy Bookout (1932–2008), American football player and coach
Jerry Bookout (1933–2006), American politician
Kevin Bookout (born 1983), American basketball player
Paul Bookout (born 1962), American politician
Phyllis Bookout, (1935–1964), All-American Girls Professional Baseball League player

See also
Maci Bookout, fictional character in the Teen Mom reality series